Bang Bang Orangutang is a 2005 Swedish film directed by Danish director Simon Staho starring Mikael Persbrandt, Tuva Novotny, Lena Olin, Fares Fares, Jonas Karlsson, Reine Brynolfsson and many other popular Swedish actors.

References

External links
 
 

2005 films
2000s Swedish-language films
2005 drama films
Swedish drama films
2000s Swedish films